Robert Eures (dates of birth and death unknown) was a noted English cricketer of the mid-18th century.  He came from Bexley in Kent and played for Kent county cricket teams as well as for All-England.  He is known to have been a good batsman and he was frequently involved in single wicket tournaments which were very popular during his career and attracted high stakes.

Career
Robert Eures is first recorded in the Daily Advertiser on 31 August 1747 playing for Kent against All-England at the Artillery Ground.  The match involved numerous leading players of the time.

In 1749 Eures played for a very strong All-England team against Surrey, which was the leading county team that season.

In 1752, Eures was named as one of the three principal players when the famous Dartford Cricket Club issued a challenge to "the rest of England".  Dartford's challenge was that with William Hodsoll, John Bryant, Robert Eures and "eight players from the parish of Dartford" it could take on and defeat any eleven players from the rest of England.  The match was due to be played on 29 July 1752 at Dartford Brent but unfortunately no result has been found and it might have been rained off.

References

English cricketers
English cricketers of 1701 to 1786
Kent cricketers
Non-international England cricketers